Joseph Mark Cooper (born 1994) is an English former footballer who played for Oldham Athletic. He played as a defender. He decided to quit football and study economics at Leeds Metropolitan University.

Career

Oldham Athletic 
Joe Cooper made his professional debut for Oldham Athletic on 23 April 2013, starting the match against Shrewsbury Town at New Meadow.

Joe Cooper was sent out on a months loan to Celtic Nation FC in August 2013, around about the start of the new football season to gain first - team experience.

On 17 September 2013 Cooper quit professional football to study economics at Leeds Metropolitan University.

Career statistics 

Up to date, as of 28 August 2013.

References

External links 
 
  - at Oldham Athletic AFC website

1994 births
Living people
English footballers
Association football defenders
Footballers from Oldham
Oldham Athletic A.F.C. players
Celtic Nation F.C. players
English Football League players
Northern Football League players